Nakhon Champassak Province (also spelled Nakorn Champassak;) was a former province in Thailand established in 1941 following the annexation of territories of French Indochina. The province was dissolved and returned to France in 1946.

History

Nakhon Champassak  was one of the provinces created as a result of the Franco-Thai War when Vichy France agreed to cede Meluprey and Thala Barivat province from Cambodia and the cis-Mekong part of Champasak Province from Laos to Thailand. The two sections were merged to form Nakhon Champassak Province. After World War II ended with the victory of the Allies, the post-war administration in France threatened to block Axis-aligned Thailand's admission into the newly formed UN. Finally in 1946 this province was dissolved and returned to France.

Administrative divisions
Nakhon Champassak was divided into five districts (amphoe) and a minor district (king amphoe). The list below are the districts of the province. The one in italics is a minor district.

See also
 Lan Chang Province
 Phra Tabong Province
 Phibunsongkhram Province
 Franco-Thai relations
 Cambodian-Thai border dispute

References

Former provinces of Thailand